The Convention for the Suppression of the Circulation of and Traffic in Obscene Publications is a 1923 League of Nations anti-pornography treaty that was initially negotiated and concluded in Geneva. It was amended by a 1947 Protocol and as of 2013 has 56 state parties.

The treaty was concluded on 12 September 1923 as the International Convention for the Suppression of the Circulation of and Traffic in Obscene Publications and entered into force on 7 August 1924. It was intended to supplement the 1910 Agreement for the Suppression of the Circulation of Obscene Publications. By the 1923 Convention, states agreed to criminalise the production, possession, importation, exportation, trade, advertisement, or display of "obscene writings, drawings, prints, paintings, printed matter, pictures, posters, emblems, photographs, cinematograph films or any other obscene objects".

On 20 October 1947, a Protocol to the Convention was approved by the United Nations General Assembly as resolution 126 (II)2. On 12 November 1947, a United Nations conference at Lake Success, New York approved the Protocol and opened it for signature. One amendment that the Protocol made was dropping the word "International" from the name of the Convention.

As of 2013, the amended Convention has 56 state parties. The unamended Convention remains in force for one state, Zimbabwe. Denmark (1968), Germany (1974), and the Netherlands (1986, solely for the Kingdom in Europe) have denounced the Convention.

External links
Original text, League of Nations Treaty Series
Ratifications of amended 1923 Convention
Ratifications of 1947 Protocol

1923 in Switzerland
League of Nations treaties
Obscenity treaties
Treaties concluded in 1923
Treaties entered into force in 1924
Treaties concluded in 1947
Treaties entered into force in 1947
Treaties of the Principality of Albania
Treaties of the German Empire
Treaties of the First Austrian Republic
Treaties of Belgium
Treaties of the Kingdom of Egypt
Treaties of Peru
Treaties of the First Brazilian Republic
Treaties of the United Kingdom
Treaties of the Union of South Africa
Treaties of New Zealand
Treaties of British India
Treaties of the Irish Free State
Treaties of the Kingdom of Bulgaria
Treaties of the Republic of China (1912–1949)
Treaties of Colombia
Treaties of Costa Rica
Treaties of Cuba
Treaties of Spain under the Restoration
Treaties of Finland
Treaties of the French Third Republic
Treaties of the Kingdom of Greece
Treaties of Haiti
Treaties of Honduras
Treaties of the Kingdom of Hungary (1920–1946)
Treaties of the Kingdom of Italy (1861–1946)
Treaties of the Empire of Japan
Treaties of Latvia
Treaties of Lithuania
Treaties of Luxembourg
Treaties of Monaco
Treaties of Panama
Treaties of Pahlavi Iran
Treaties of the Second Polish Republic
Treaties of the Free City of Danzig
Treaties of the Portuguese First Republic
Treaties of El Salvador
Treaties of the Kingdom of Yugoslavia
Treaties of Thailand
Treaties of Switzerland
Treaties of Czechoslovakia
Treaties of Turkey
Treaties of Uruguay
Treaties extended to South West Africa
Treaties extended to the Western Samoa Trust Territory
Treaties of the Kingdom of Afghanistan
Treaties of Australia
Treaties of Belarus
Treaties of the Kingdom of Cambodia (1953–1970)
Treaties of Canada
Treaties of Cyprus
Treaties of the Czech Republic
Treaties of the Republic of the Congo (Léopoldville)
Treaties of Fiji
Treaties of Ghana
Treaties of Guatemala
Treaties of Jamaica
Treaties of Jordan
Treaties of Lesotho
Treaties of Liberia
Treaties of Madagascar
Treaties of Malawi
Treaties of the Federation of Malaya
Treaties of Malta
Treaties of Mauritius
Treaties of Mexico
Treaties of Montenegro
Treaties of Myanmar
Treaties of Nigeria
Treaties of Norway
Treaties of the Dominion of Pakistan
Treaties of the Socialist Republic of Romania
Treaties of the Soviet Union
Treaties of Serbia and Montenegro
Treaties of Sierra Leone
Treaties of Slovakia
Treaties of the Solomon Islands
Treaties of the Dominion of Ceylon
Treaties of Trinidad and Tobago
Treaties of Tanganyika
Treaties of Zambia
Treaties of Zimbabwe
Treaties extended to the Dutch East Indies
Treaties extended to Curaçao and Dependencies
Treaties extended to Surinam (Dutch colony)
Treaties extended to Hong Kong
Treaties of East Germany